The 1967–68 New York Rangers season was the franchise's 42nd season.

The season was significant for its move from the third Madison Square Garden to the fourth. The Rangers played their last game in the old Garden on Sunday afternoon, February 11 (the day of the official opening of the fourth Garden) when they tied the Detroit Red Wings 3-3. The next Sunday, February 18, the Rangers played their first game at the new Garden, a 3-0 win against the expansion Philadelphia Flyers. In all the Rangers played fourteen of their forty home games at the new Garden, including three playoff games against the Chicago Black Hawks. The Rangers became the first Original Six team to leave their old arena for a modern arena; it would be another eleven years before another of the original six (the Detroit Red Wings) would move to a modern arena.

Regular season

Final standings

Record vs. opponents

Schedule and results

|- align="center" bgcolor="#CCFFCC"
| 1 || 11 || @ Chicago Black Hawks || 6–3 || 1–0–0
|- align="center" bgcolor="#FFBBBB"
| 2 || 15 || @ Detroit Red Wings || 3–2 || 1–1–0
|- align="center" bgcolor="white"
| 3 || 18 || Montreal Canadiens || 2–2 || 1–1–1
|- align="center" bgcolor="#CCFFCC"
| 4 || 21 || @ Toronto Maple Leafs || 5–3 || 2–1–1
|- align="center" bgcolor="#CCFFCC"
| 5 || 22 || Pittsburgh Penguins || 6–4 || 3–1–1
|- align="center" bgcolor="white"
| 6 || 25 || Chicago Black Hawks || 2–2 || 3–1–2
|- align="center" bgcolor="white"
| 7 || 26 || @ Montreal Canadiens || 1–1 || 3–1–3
|- align="center" bgcolor="#CCFFCC"
| 8 || 29 || Toronto Maple Leafs || 3–2 || 4–1–3
|- align="center" bgcolor="#CCFFCC"
| 9 || 31 || @ Los Angeles Kings || 6–1 || 5–1–3
|-

|- align="center" bgcolor="#CCFFCC"
| 10 || 1 || @ Oakland Seals || 2–0 || 6–1–3
|- align="center" bgcolor="#FFBBBB"
| 11 || 4 || @ Toronto Maple Leafs || 4–2 || 6–2–3
|- align="center" bgcolor="#FFBBBB"
| 12 || 8 || Boston Bruins || 6–3 || 6–3–3
|- align="center" bgcolor="#CCFFCC"
| 13 || 12 || Oakland Seals || 5–3 || 7–3–3
|- align="center" bgcolor="#FFBBBB"
| 14 || 16 || @ Philadelphia Flyers || 3–2 || 7–4–3
|- align="center" bgcolor="#FFBBBB"
| 15 || 18 || @ Boston Bruins || 3–1 || 7–5–3
|- align="center" bgcolor="#CCFFCC"
| 16 || 19 || Minnesota North Stars || 5–2 || 8–5–3
|- align="center" bgcolor="#FFBBBB"
| 17 || 22 || Chicago Black Hawks || 7–1 || 8–6–3
|- align="center" bgcolor="#FFBBBB"
| 18 || 23 || @ Boston Bruins || 4–2 || 8–7–3
|- align="center" bgcolor="#CCFFCC"
| 19 || 26 || St. Louis Blues || 1–0 || 9–7–3
|- align="center" bgcolor="#FFBBBB"
| 20 || 29 || Detroit Red Wings || 3–1 || 9–8–3
|-

|- align="center" bgcolor="#CCFFCC"
| 21 || 2 || @ Pittsburgh Penguins || 4–1 || 10–8–3
|- align="center" bgcolor="#CCFFCC"
| 22 || 3 || Los Angeles Kings || 4–2 || 11–8–3
|- align="center" bgcolor="white"
| 23 || 6 || Detroit Red Wings || 3–3 || 11–8–4
|- align="center" bgcolor="#FFBBBB"
| 24 || 7 || @ Boston Bruins || 3–1 || 11–9–4
|- align="center" bgcolor="#FFBBBB"
| 25 || 9 || @ Detroit Red Wings || 3–2 || 11–10–4
|- align="center" bgcolor="#CCFFCC"
| 26 || 10 || Montreal Canadiens || 3–2 || 12–10–4
|- align="center" bgcolor="#FFBBBB"
| 27 || 13 || @ Chicago Black Hawks || 5–2 || 12–11–4
|- align="center" bgcolor="#FFBBBB"
| 28 || 16 || @ Toronto Maple Leafs || 4–2 || 12–12–4
|- align="center" bgcolor="#CCFFCC"
| 29 || 17 || St. Louis Blues || 5–3 || 13–12–4
|- align="center" bgcolor="#CCFFCC"
| 30 || 20 || Detroit Red Wings || 2–0 || 14–12–4
|- align="center" bgcolor="#FFBBBB"
| 31 || 23 || Boston Bruins || 4–0 || 14–13–4
|- align="center" bgcolor="#CCFFCC"
| 32 || 25 || @ Philadelphia Flyers || 3–1 || 15–13–4
|- align="center" bgcolor="white"
| 33 || 27 || Minnesota North Stars || 3–3 || 15–13–5
|- align="center" bgcolor="white"
| 34 || 30 || Chicago Black Hawks || 3–3 || 15–13–6
|- align="center" bgcolor="#CCFFCC"
| 35 || 31 || Toronto Maple Leafs || 4–0 || 16–13–6
|-

|- align="center" bgcolor="white"
| 36 || 3 || Boston Bruins || 5–5 || 16–13–7
|- align="center" bgcolor="#FFBBBB"
| 37 || 6 || @ Montreal Canadiens || 5–2 || 16–14–7
|- align="center" bgcolor="#CCFFCC"
| 38 || 7 || Toronto Maple Leafs || 6–2 || 17–14–7
|- align="center" bgcolor="white"
| 39 || 10 || @ Chicago Black Hawks || 3–3 || 17–14–8
|- align="center" bgcolor="#CCFFCC"
| 40 || 13 || @ St. Louis Blues || 3–1 || 18–14–8
|- align="center" bgcolor="#CCFFCC"
| 41 || 17 || @ Chicago Black Hawks || 4–2 || 19–14–8
|- align="center" bgcolor="#FFBBBB"
| 42 || 19 || @ Los Angeles Kings || 5–2 || 19–15–8
|- align="center" bgcolor="#CCFFCC"
| 43 || 20 || @ Oakland Seals || 3–0 || 20–15–8
|- align="center" bgcolor="#CCFFCC"
| 44 || 24 || Boston Bruins || 2–1 || 21–15–8
|- align="center" bgcolor="#FFBBBB"
| 45 || 27 || @ St. Louis Blues || 4–3 || 21–16–8
|- align="center" bgcolor="#CCFFCC"
| 46 || 28 || Oakland Seals || 4–2 || 22–16–8
|- align="center" bgcolor="#FFBBBB"
| 47 || 31 || Chicago Black Hawks || 3–2 || 22–17–8
|-

|- align="center" bgcolor="#FFBBBB"
| 48 || 1 || @ Montreal Canadiens || 5–2 || 22–18–8
|- align="center" bgcolor="white"
| 49 || 3 || @ Boston Bruins || 3–3 || 22–18–9
|- align="center" bgcolor="#CCFFCC"
| 50 || 4 || Montreal Canadiens || 3–0 || 23–18–9
|- align="center" bgcolor="#CCFFCC"
| 51 || 8 || @ Detroit Red Wings || 3–2 || 24–18–9
|- align="center" bgcolor="white"
| 52 || 10 || @ Pittsburgh Penguins || 2–2 || 24–18–10
|- align="center" bgcolor="white"
| 53 || 11 || Detroit Red Wings || 3–3 || 24–18–11
|- align="center" bgcolor="#CCFFCC"
| 54 || 15 || @ Minnesota North Stars || 6–2 || 25–18–11
|- align="center" bgcolor="#CCFFCC"
| 55 || 17 || @ Toronto Maple Leafs || 3–2 || 26–18–11
|- align="center" bgcolor="#CCFFCC"
| 56 || 18 || Philadelphia Flyers || 3–1 || 27–18–11
|- align="center" bgcolor="#FFBBBB"
| 57 || 21 || Montreal Canadiens || 7–2 || 27–19–11
|- align="center" bgcolor="#CCFFCC"
| 58 || 24 || @ Montreal Canadiens || 6–1 || 28–19–11
|- align="center" bgcolor="#CCFFCC"
| 59 || 25 || Toronto Maple Leafs || 3–1 || 29–19–11
|- align="center" bgcolor="#CCFFCC"
| 60 || 29 || @ Detroit Red Wings || 4–2 || 30–19–11
|-

|- align="center" bgcolor="#CCFFCC"
| 61 || 2 || Philadelphia Flyers || 4–0 || 31–19–11
|- align="center" bgcolor="#CCFFCC"
| 62 || 3 || Chicago Black Hawks || 4–0 || 32–19–11
|- align="center" bgcolor="#CCFFCC"
| 63 || 6 || Detroit Red Wings || 6–1 || 33–19–11
|- align="center" bgcolor="white"
| 64 || 9 || @ Minnesota North Stars || 1–1 || 33–19–12
|- align="center" bgcolor="#FFBBBB"
| 65 || 10 || Los Angeles Kings || 4–3 || 33–20–12
|- align="center" bgcolor="#FFBBBB"
| 66 || 13 || Boston Bruins || 2–1 || 33–21–12
|- align="center" bgcolor="#FFBBBB"
| 67 || 14 || @ Montreal Canadiens || 3–1 || 33–22–12
|- align="center" bgcolor="#CCFFCC"
| 68 || 17 || Pittsburgh Penguins || 3–0 || 34–22–12
|- align="center" bgcolor="#CCFFCC"
| 69 || 20 || @ Chicago Black Hawks || 5–3 || 35–22–12
|- align="center" bgcolor="#FFBBBB"
| 70 || 23 || @ Toronto Maple Leafs || 3–1 || 35–23–12
|- align="center" bgcolor="#CCFFCC"
| 71 || 24 || Toronto Maple Leafs || 4–2 || 36–23–12
|- align="center" bgcolor="#CCFFCC"
| 72 || 28 || @ Boston Bruins || 5–4 || 37–23–12
|- align="center" bgcolor="#CCFFCC"
| 73 || 30 || @ Detroit Red Wings || 3–1 || 38–23–12
|- align="center" bgcolor="#CCFFCC"
| 74 || 31 || Montreal Canadiens || 4–2 || 39–23–12
|-

Playoffs

Key:  Win  Loss

Player statistics
Skaters

Goaltenders

†Denotes player spent time with another team before joining Rangers. Stats reflect time with Rangers only.
‡Traded mid-season. Stats reflect time with Rangers only.

Awards and honors

Transactions

Draft picks
New York's picks at the 1967 NHL Amateur Draft in Montreal, Quebec, Canada.

Farm teams

See also
1967–68 NHL season

References

External links
 

New York Rangers seasons
New York Rangers
New York Rangers
New York Rangers
New York Rangers
Madison Square Garden
1960s in Manhattan